The Abdoulaye Faunal Reserve is a protected area located in Togo. It was established in 1951.

References

Faunal reserves
National parks of Togo